Dormushali Safet Saidhodzha or simply Mushi ((born 16 May 1986) is a Bulgarian football striker of Turkish heritage.

Career

Botev Plovdiv
Saidhodzha started to play in local team Asenovets. Then he moved to Botev Plovdiv. Three years later he signed his first professional contract with Botev Plovdiv. He made his official debut for Botev in a match against Lokomotiv Sofia on 29 November 2003. He substituted Stefan Kostadinov in the second half and played for 26 minutes. The result of the match was a 0:1 loss for Botev. On 6 April 2005 Muscho, as he is known among the Botev supporters, scored six goals against Lokomotiv Gorna Oryahovitsa in a match from Bulgarian second division. He scored in the 5th, 42nd, 59th, 61st, 77th and 79th minute. The result of the match was an 8:0 win for Botev.

In January 2007 Saidhodzha was loaned out for six months to Danish professional football team Randers FC. However, he played in only two matches and returned to Botev in June 2007.

On 25 August 2008 it was reported in the Bulgaria media that he was a target for Austria side LASK Linz. Few days later LASK Linz officially invited Saidhodzha to join the training sessions of their first team for a week.

CSKA Sofia
In the winter break of 2008-09 season he moved to CSKA Sofia. He scored in his unofficial debut for the club against FK Jagodina netting the third goal for the final 4:1 win for CSKA. He scored 9 goals in 13 matches for CSKA and a total 15 goals in 29 matches for CSKA Sofia and Botev Plovdiv.

Litex Lovech
On 31 August 2009, several hours before the end of the summer transfer window, he was loaned to Litex Lovech for six months. In his spell at Litex, Saidhodzha made 18 appearances and scored 6 goals.

AEP Paphos
In the summer of 2011 Saidhodzha signed with Cypriot side AEP Paphos.

Etar Veliko Tarnovo
During the 2012/2013 A PFG season he played for Etar Veliko Tarnovo, captaining the team on occasions.

International career
Between 2006 and 2007 Saidhodzha played for the Bulgaria national under-21 football team.

Honours
Litex Lovech
Bulgarian Supercup Runners-up 2009
Bulgarian A PFG 2009-10
CSKA Sofia
Bulgarian A PFG 2008-09 Runners-up

References

External links
 

Bulgarian footballers
1986 births
Living people
People from Asenovgrad
Association football forwards
Bulgarian expatriate footballers
Botev Plovdiv players
Randers FC players
PFC CSKA Sofia players
PFC Litex Lovech players
FC Lokomotiv 1929 Sofia players
First Professional Football League (Bulgaria) players
Danish Superliga players
Expatriate men's footballers in Denmark
Bulgarian people of Turkish descent